Christophe Julien is a French composer of film and television music, largely classical, twice-nominated for César Award for best original film music.

Background

Christophe Julien was born on November 14, 1972, in Dijon Côte-d'Or, France.  At the Conservatoire national supérieur de musique de Paris he studied under guitarist Alexandre Lagoya in harmony, counterpoint, 20th-century music, and chamber music. At the Sorbonne University 1, he studied Indian music and musicology.

Career

Julien's first musical creations were for cinema: short films, documentaries, and commercials. The first commercial success came in 2008 with the comedic Vilaine (film), which began his collaboration with Albert Dupontel on Le Vilain, followed by 9 mois ferme (2013) and Au revoir là-haut (2017, with score nominated for the 43rd César Awards in 2018).  He also composed music for Irena Salina's documentary Flow:  For Love of Water, which showed at the 2008 Sundance Film Festival.  In 2009, he began collaborating with film director Éric Bernard on the adventure film 600 kilos d'or pur.  In 2011, he worked with director Emmanuelle Millet on the period piece La Brindille.  In 2021, he was nominated twice, first for César Award for Best Original Music at the 46th César Awards for Adieu les cons (Bye Bye Morons) and then for the International Film Music Critics Association Award for Best Original Score for a Comedy Film for Delicieux.

Work

Scores for Film
 2007: 
 Si c'était lui...
 J'veux pas que tu t'en ailles
 Flow: For Love of Water
 Fragments
 Manon sur lee bitume
 2008: Vilaine
 2009:
 Téhéran
 Victor
  Le Vilain
 2010: 600 kilograms of pure gold by Eric Besnard
 2011:
 Le Brindille
 Une folle envie
 2012: Mes héros
 2013: 
 9 mois ferme
 Demi-sœur
 2015: 
 Étourdissement
 Le Goût des merveilles
 Nos femmes
 2017: 
 Au revoir là-haut (See You Up There (film))
 Grand Froid
 2018: Le Jeu (Nothing to Hide (2018 film))
 2019: 
 Espirt de famille
 Relai
 2020: 
 Adieu les cons (Bye Bye Morons)
 Urabá
 2021: 
 Le Sens de la famille
 Delicieux
 2022: 
 Canailles
 Adieu Monsieur Haffman (See You Up There (film))

Scores for Television
 2012: Kaboul Kitchen (season 1)
 2013: Kaboul Kitchen (season 2)
 2015: Les Pieds dans le tapis 
 2017: Kaboul Kitchen (season 3)
 2018: Noces rouges
 2019: Noces d'or

Published Music
 . Concerto pour deux violons en ré maj by Vivaldi, Patrice Fontanarosa, Alexis Galpérine, Joël Pontet, Coline Serreau, and the chamber orchestra of the Conservatoire de Paris, original musics by Coline Serreau, AG and Christophe Julien etc. La bande son Universal 067 738-2
 Symphony N°1 "Au revoir Là haut" (2017)

Awards
 2016: 
 Luchon Festival: best original music for Les Pieds dans le tapis
  Lauriers de la radio et de la télévision: best original music for Les Pieds dans le tapis
 2018: 
 UCMF (French Film Music Association) Award: best original music for Au revoir là-haut
 Jerry Goldsmith Award: best original music for Au revoir là-haut
 43rd César Awards music nominated for Au revoir là-haut
 2019:  Cannes Film Festival: Adami Talents selection for Relai
 2021: 
 46th César Awards music nominated for Adieu les cons
 International Film Music Critics Association Award for Best Original Score for a Comedy Film for Delicieux

See also
 César Award for Best Original Music
 43rd César Awards
 46th César Awards
 César Awards

References

External sources
 Official website of Christophe Julien
 
 Unifrance
 Discogs
 MusicBrainz

1972 births
Living people
Musicians from Dijon
César Awards